Dudleya hendrixii is a rare succulent plant known by the common name Hendrix's liveforever. It was discovered in late 2016 by researchers from San Diego State University and University of California, Santa Cruz.

Description 
Having upright, waxy, terete leaves, the plant is only found on a few acres of the Colonet Peninsula of Baja California, Mexico. Dudleya hendrixii is summer deciduous, dying in the summer only to re-sprout in the fall.

Etymology 
The plant’s name translates directly to "Hendrix’s liveforever," as Mark Dodero, the former graduate student from SDSU who is credited with discovering the plant, was listening to Jimi Hendrix's "Voodoo Child" at the moment he found the plant.

Ecology 
Because of its small habitat, the plant under threat of extinction from grazing and development.

References

hendrixii
Endemic flora of Mexico
Flora of Baja California